The 2017 Winnipeg Blue Bombers season was the 60th season for the team in the Canadian Football League (CFL) and their 85th season overall. This was the fourth season under head coach Mike O'Shea and the fourth full season under general manager Kyle Walters.

The Blue Bombers clinched a playoff berth for the second consecutive season with a win over the BC Lions on October 14, 2017. The team hosted a CFL playoff game for the first time since 2011 (and a West Division playoff game for the first time since 2003) after finishing in second place with a 12–6 record. However, they lost that West Semi-Final game to the Edmonton Eskimos.

Offseason

CFL draft
The 2017 CFL Draft took place on May 7, 2017. The Blue Bombers had eight selections in the eight-round draft after trading former starting quarterback Drew Willy for the first overall pick. They lost fourth and fifth round picks in trades for quarterbacks Kevin Glenn and Matt Nichols, respectively. The Bombers obtained another fourth round pick after trading down in the draft with the Stampeders.

Preseason

Regular season

Standings

Schedule

Post-season

Schedule

Team

Roster

Coaching staff

References

Winnipeg Blue Bombers seasons
2017 Canadian Football League season by team
2017 in Manitoba